Fred Gannon Rocky Bayou State Park is a Florida State Park located on the northwestern coast of the U.S. state of Florida, southeast of Niceville. The address is 4281 Highway 20. Native American middens and artifacts can be seen throughout the park.

Recreational activities
The park has such amenities as bicycling, birding, boating, canoeing, fishing, hiking, kayaking, picnicking, tubing, wildlife viewing and full camping facilities.

Biology

The park's Sand Pine (Pinus clausa) forest has large, mature Sand Pines towering over other scrub vegetation, such as Florida Rosemary (Ceratiola ericoides), Reindeer Moss (Cladonia spp.), and scrub oaks: sand live oak (Quercus geminata), sandhill oak (Quercus inopina), myrtle oak (Quercus myrtifolia), and Chapman's oak (Quercus chapmanii).

External links

 Fred Gannon Rocky Bayou State Park at Florida State Parks

State parks of Florida
Parks in Okaloosa County, Florida
Protected areas established in 1966
1966 establishments in Florida